Joakim Ulf Bertil Runnemo (born 18 December 1986) is a Swedish footballer who plays as a midfielder.

References

External links
 
 
 IK Frej profile 

1986 births
Living people
Association football midfielders
Swedish footballers
Allsvenskan players
Superettan players
IF Brommapojkarna players
Ljungskile SK players
IK Sirius Fotboll players
IK Frej players